UFC Fight Night: Almeida vs. Garbrandt (also known as UFC Fight Night 88) was a mixed martial arts event held on May 29, 2016, at the Mandalay Bay Events Center in Las Vegas, Nevada.

Background
A bantamweight bout between top undefeated prospects Thomas Almeida and Cody Garbrandt headlined the event.

Keith Berish was very briefly linked to a bout with Jake Collier at the event. However, Berish pulled out due to injury on March 31 and was replaced by UFC newcomer Alberto Uda.

Joe Proctor was expected to face Erik Koch at the event. However, Proctor pulled out of the fight on April 21 citing injury and was replaced by Shane Campbell.

Carlos Diego Ferreira was expected to face Abel Trujillo, but was pulled from the event on May 13 due to a potential USADA anti-doping violation stemming from a recent out-of-competition sample collection. In accordance with the UFC Anti-Doping Policy, Ferreira has received a provisional suspension. Additional violation information will be provided at the appropriate time as the process moves forward. He was replaced by UFC newcomer Jordan Rinaldi.

Results

Bonus awards
The following fighters were awarded $50,000 bonuses:
Fight of the Night: Jeremy Stephens vs. Renan Barão
Performance of the Night: Cody Garbrandt and Jake Collier

Reported payout
The following is the reported payout to the fighters as reported to the Nevada State Athletic Commission. It does not include sponsor money and also does not include the UFC's traditional "fight night" bonuses.
 Cody Garbrandt: $48,000 (includes $24,000 win bonus) def. Thomas Almeida: $25,000
 Jeremy Stephens: $100,000 (includes $50,000 win bonus) def. Renan Barão: $50,000
 Rick Story: $76,000 (includes $38,000 win bonus) def. Tarec Saffiedine: $37,000
 Chris Camozzi: $72,000 (includes $36,000 win bonus) def. Vitor Miranda: $18,000
 Lorenz Larkin: $72,000 (includes $36,000 win bonus) def. Jorge Masvidal: $57,000
 Paul Felder: $42,000 (includes $21,000 win bonus) def. Josh Burkman: $48,000
 Sara McMann: $50,000 (includes $25,000 win bonus) def. Jessica Eye: $25,000
 Abel Trujillo: $50,000 (includes $25,000 win bonus) def. Jordan Rinaldi: $10,000
 Jake Collier: $30,000 (includes $15,000 win bonus) def. Alberto Uda: $10,000
 Erik Koch: $42,000 (includes $21,000 win bonus) def. Shane Campbell: $15,000
 Bryan Caraway: $36,000 (includes $18,000 win bonus) def. Aljamain Sterling: $30,000
 Adam Milstead: $20,000 (includes $10,000 win bonus) def. Chris De La Rocha: $10,000

See also
List of UFC events
2016 in UFC

References

UFC Fight Night
2016 in mixed martial arts
Mixed martial arts in Las Vegas
May 2016 sports events in the United States